The Edgar Allan Poe Award for Best Critical/Biographical Work, established in 1977, is a literary award presented as part of the Edgar Awards for a nonfiction critical or biographical hardcover, paperback, or electronic book. 

To be eligible, biographical books should be "biographies of mystery writers or other notable practitioners of the genre, not to criminals." Criminal biographies are eligible for the Edgar Allan Poe Award for Best Fact Crime.

The Edgar Allan Poe Award for Best Critical/Biographical Work winners are listed below.

Recipients

2000s

2010s

2020s

References 

Awards established in 1977
American literary awards
English-language literary awards